In algebra, the terms left and right denote the order of a binary operation (usually, but not always, called "multiplication") in non-commutative algebraic structures.
A binary operation ∗ is usually written in the infix form:

The argument  is placed on the left side, and the argument  is on the right side.

A two-sided property is fulfilled on both sides. A one-sided property is related to one (unspecified) of two sides.

Although the terms are similar, left–right distinction in algebraic parlance is not related either to left and right limits in calculus, or to left and right in geometry.

Binary operation as an operator 
A binary operation  may be considered as a family of unary operators through currying:
,
depending on  as a parameter – this is the family of right operations. Similarly,

defines the family of left operations parametrized with .

If for some , the left operation  is the identity operation, then  is called a left identity. Similarly, if , then  is a right identity.

In ring theory, a subring which is invariant under any left multiplication in a ring is called a left ideal. Similarly, a right multiplication-invariant subring is a right ideal.

Left and right modules 
Over non-commutative rings, the left–right distinction is applied to modules, namely to specify the side where a scalar (module element) appears in the scalar multiplication. 

The distinction is not purely syntactical because one gets two different associativity rules (the lowest row in the table) which link multiplication in a module with multiplication in a ring.

A bimodule is simultaneously a left and right module, with two different scalar multiplication operations, obeying an associativity condition on them.

Other examples 
 Left eigenvectors
 Left and right group actions

In category theory 
In category theory the usage of "left" is "right" has some algebraic resemblance, but refers to left and right sides of morphisms. See adjoint functors.

See also 
 Operator associativity

External links 
 
 
 

Abstract algebra
Mathematical terminology